Gandul may refer to:

 Pigeon pea
 Gândul, a Romanian daily newspaper. 
 Valkyrie, Gandul being one of the three most powerful valkyries.